Regina Soufli is a Greek-America physicist and a staff scientist at Lawrence Livermore National Laboratory, in Livermore, California, where she works on the manufacturing and the characterization of materials and thin-film coatings for extreme ultraviolet (EUV) and X-ray application. The result of her work as the heart of the reflective optics used in EUV lithography, the next-generation in semiconductor manufacturing technology, in satellites such as NASA's Solar Dynamics Observatory, or on optics for Free-electron lasers such as the Linac Coherent Light Source at SLAC National Accelerator Laboratory.

Career 
Soufli earned her PhD from the University of California, Berkeley, studying the optical Constants of materials in the EUV/Soft X-ray Region for multilayer mirror Applications under the supervision of David Attwood Lawrence Berkeley National Laboratory , after initially completing an undergraduate degree at the National Technical University of Athens in Greece. After her PhD, she joined the Center for Astrophysics  Harvard & Smithsonian in 1997 to work on the optics of the Chandra X-ray Observatory. She then joined Lawrence Livermore National Laboratory in 1999 as a staff scientist.

Soufli is a fellow of the Optical Society of America and a senior member of the SPIE.

References

External links 
 

Living people
Lawrence Livermore National Laboratory staff
American physicists
Year of birth missing (living people)